Tocopilla Province is one of the three provinces in the northern Chilean region of Antofagasta (II). Its capital is the city of Tocopilla.

Geography and demography
Between the 1992 and 2002 censuses, the population fell by 18.4% (7,129 persons).

Administration
As a province, Tocopilla is a second-level administrative division of Chile, which is further divided into two communes (comunas). The province is administered by a presidentially appointed provincial delegate. Rossana Montero Morales was appointed by president Gabriel Boric.

Communes
 Tocopilla (capital)
 María Elena

References

External links
  Delegation of Tocopilla

Provinces of Antofagasta Region
Provinces of Chile